Chester Cicero Cole (4 June 1824 – 4 October 1913) was a justice of the Iowa Supreme Court from March 1, 1864 to January 19, 1876 appointed from Polk County, Iowa. He became chief justice in 1869. Cole was a founder of both Iowa law schools.

Early life and family
He was born in Oxford, New York to Samuel Cole and his wife, Alice, (born Pullman). Cole graduated from Harvard Law School.

He married Miss Amanda M. Bennett on June 25, 1848, a daughter of Egbert and Gertrude Richtmyer Bennett The couple had seven children:
Calvin S. — died young
William Watson — married Frances Josephine Chapin, with whom he had three children. In 1888, he removed to Portland Ore where he was a lawyer and engaged in the lumber business; dying there November 17, 1894.
Gertrude Alice — married railroad superintendent A. C. Atherton of Lewistown, Illinois, by whom she had three children
Mary E. — married Des Moines lawyer D. C. McMartin, by whom she had four children; he died August 10, 1895
Chester C. — died in infancy
Frank B. — married Ella Jenkins, with whom he had two children; the couple resided in Havana, Illinois where Frank worked for the railroad
Third daughter Carrie Stone married druggist J. R. Hurlbut of Hurlbut & McArthur, by whom she had one child

Career
Following graduation, Cole practiced law in Marion, Kentucky, before moving to Iowa in 1857.

With Justice George Grover Wright, Cole co-founded Iowa Law School in 1865, in Des Moines, which, in 1868, relocated to Iowa City, becoming the law department of the University of Iowa, later the University of Iowa College of Law.

In 1875, Cole left the University of Iowa and founded Iowa College of Law in Des Moines, which joined Drake University, upon its founding in 1881, later becoming Drake University Law School.

He is buried in Des Moines' Woodland Cemetery.

See also
Clark v. Board of School Directors

References

External links
The Drake University Bulletin Volume 7, Issue 1, (Drake University history), Drake University, 1903.

Justices of the Iowa Supreme Court
Place of birth missing
Place of death missing
1824 births
1913 deaths
Chief Justices of the Iowa Supreme Court
Harvard Law School alumni
University of Iowa College of Law faculty
Drake University faculty
19th-century American judges